House of Dreams is the second album by the AOR side project of former Rainbow vocalist Joe Lynn Turner under the name Sunstorm. It was released by Frontiers Records in Europe on April 17, 2009. The album was then released in Japan with the exclusive bonus track "Standing in the Fire" on June 24, 2009.

The song "I Found Love" was originally a Joe Lynn Turner solo track he performed live in the 1980s.

Track listing
 "Divided" - 4:37 (James Martin, Tom Martin, Mikey Wilson)
 "Don't Give Up" - 4:48 (J. Martin, T. Martin)
 "The Spirit Inside" - 4:01 (J. Martin, T. Martin)
 "I Found Love" - 3:59 (Joe Lynn Turner, Patrick Cowden Hyde)
 "Say You Will" - 4:33 (Jim Peterik)
 "Gutters of Gold" - 4:38 (Peterik)
 "Save a Place (In Your Heart)" - 4:13 (Lynn Turner, James House, Neal Debrah L, Paul Sabu)
 "Forever Now" - 4:16  (Lynn Turner, Bob Held)
 "Tears on the Pages" - 4:35  (Jon Lind, Jim Peterik, Russ Ballard)
 "House of Dreams" - 4:51  (J. Martin, T. Martin)
 "Walk On" - 4:35  (Lynn Turner, Desmond Child)
 "Standing in the Fire" - 4:15  (Joe Lynn Turner, Marc Muller) {Japanese edition bonus track}

Personnel
Sunstorm
Joe Lynn Turner - vocals, production
Dennis Ward - bass guitar, backing vocals, additional guitars, production, recording, mixing, mastering
Uwe Reitenauer - guitars
Gunther Werno - keyboards
Chris Schmidt - drums

Guest musicians
Thorsten Koehne - solo guitars
Marco Bayati - additional solo guitar on "I Found Love"

Production
Karl Cochran - vocals production
Serafino Perugino - executive producer

References

External links
Joe Lynn Turner official website
Dennis Ward official website
Rock Eyez Review
Melodic Rock Review
PlanetAOR Review
Allmusic Listing

2009 albums
Sunstorm (band) albums
Frontiers Records albums
Albums produced by Dennis Ward (musician)